Mountain Koiari (Koiali) is a language of Oro Province, Papua New Guinea. It is not very similar to the other language which shares its name, Grass Koiari. Half of its speakers are monolingual.

It is spoken in Barai, Efogi, and Koiari villages of Koiari Rural LLG, as well as in Hiri Rural LLG.

References

Languages of Papua New Guinea
Koiarian languages